General Glory is the name of two DC Comics characters. The persona is mostly used by writers as a parody of Marvel's Captain America with exaggerated "patriotic values" and a sidekick called Ernie (aka Ernie The Battling Boy), who was similar to Bucky. General Glory first appeared in Justice League International #46 as a 1940s style hero placed in a modern world, resulting in cultural differences and personality issues. Whereas Captain America is patriotic, heroic, and rational, General Glory is so blindly patriotic that it approaches the point of fault, unwilling and psychologically unable to believe that his country or international peacekeeping organizations have a dark side. He was introduced as a comic foil for the jingoistic Green Lantern corps member Guy Gardner in the early 1990s.

Fictional character biography

Joseph Jones
Joseph Jones was a soldier in World War II who was granted superior abilities by Lady Liberty herself upon saying the words:

"Lady of Liberty, hear my plea — For the land of the brave — And home of the free!"

He became a government agent, under the authority of an Agent Newkirk Sharp. Sharp arranged for General Glory comic books to be published, so that people would believe he was a fictional character. In England, his adventures were published in the pages of Tuppenny Fun.

During his many adventures in World War 2, General Glory worked with the original Beefeater, an English-based super hero. One mission saw him working with the time-travelling hero Booster Gold - who had come to 1943 looking for his missing adopted daughter - when a Nazi scientist was attempting to create a time machine, although Booster regarded Glory as mentally unbalanced at best.

As with Marvel Comics' Captain America, General Glory disappeared in an Arctic mission. Rather than be encased in ice, however, he returned to America with little memory of his past. He would later learn that Sharp had drugged him and given him a new identity.

Many years later, he was outbid for a General Glory comic book by Guy Gardner. He persuaded Gardner to let him read the book by offering him the refund price of the bid.  Reading the comic, Jones shouts out the magic words and became General Glory again. Shortly after this, he was arrested for treason by Ernest E. Earnest. It eventually transpired that Sharp had framed Glory to divert suspicion from himself. Ernie confronted him and was shot. Sharp was brought to justice by Glory and the Justice League, and General Glory became a member of the team. Maxwell Lord considered that a true Golden Age hero might be good for their image, and Glory thereafter assists the team from time to time. For example, Glory and the JLA defeat a revenge-crazed elderly Nazi that had been plaguing Jones with technologically advanced threats for some time; often chasing him out of the latest home Jones had created. Said Nazi is finally defeated in issue #50.

In this time period, Glory owns a dog named 'Liberty'; the pet is featured in a later Justice League Quarterly issue. The dog unintentionally helps save the JLA who were having miniaturization issues.

Glory assists the League in saving Ice from demonic possession. At the same time he tries to help Maxwell Lord with his seeming drinking problem.

Donovan Wallace
During one of Jones's transformations into his elderly self, he suffered a cardiac episode and ended up in the hospital next to New York City policeman Donovan Wallace, who had become paralyzed risking his life to save a child from gangsters.

By this point, Jones was too weak to change into his alter ego, but he regaled Wallace with inspiring stories about his adventures as Glory (the stories paralleled thematic trends in superhero comics). Initially skeptical, Donovan eventually came to believe in the spirit of glory and he was able to tap into the same energies that once powered Jones. He manifested great strength and agility, wings and throwing razors. He left his hospital bed and crushed the gangs that had crippled him. When he returned to the hospital, Jones was in cardiac arrest. To keep his legacy alive, Jones bequeathed his powers to Donovan, whose full mobility was restored. As Donovan becomes the second General Glory, Jones passes away.

Wallace was known to be estranged from his wife and child, but in Justice Society of America (vol. 3) #3 it is revealed that Wallace and everyone attending his wedding was dismembered during the ceremony by a Nazi-themed team called the Fourth Reich. This group's mission, backed up by the villain Vandal Savage, was to destroy the legacy of all American heroes whose identities were closely tied to America itself.

During the 52 series, Martian Manhunter constructs a JLA memorial in the hills above Happy Harbor, a statue dedicated to each fallen JLA member, Glory included.

Powers and abilities
 General Glory was mystically endowed with enhanced strength and durability, but only in his "General Glory" persona, otherwise he was a frail 80-year-old man. He has demonstrated enough strength to lift objects as heavy as tanks. He was in peak physical condition in all other aspects and a capable military tactician. He seemed impervious to the effects of old age in his superhero persona, but when he decided to go back to being an ordinary human he would die of old age.
 He seldom utilized his abilities, instead choosing to give long winded patriotic speeches. This was actually useful as it drew fire away from other Justice League members, as villains quickly wanted to kill General Glory to avoid having to endure his dissertations on morality.
 The second General Glory demonstrated some different powers and weapons than the first. He had a sharp throwing star that would return to him after being released, and also had golden bird wings that enabled him to fly.

Other versions
 One possible future shows an older Power Girl traveling back in time to World War II and meeting Ernie and Glory. Distracted by Power Girl's attractiveness, Ernie is slain by a falling bomb. Glory somehow convinces Power Girl to become his new, bowl-headed sidekick.
 Another possible future stays in the future, where a Glory-influenced League, bowl-haircuts for all, is reformed. This and the older Power Girl event take place in the second JLE annual.
 In one future-past event, Lobo arrives in the wrong time and gender from Heaven. He encounters Ernie and General Glory where he is then pummeled.

References

Comics characters introduced in 1991
Comics characters introduced in 1994
Characters created by Keith Giffen
DC Comics military personnel
DC Comics superheroes
Fictional World War II veterans
United States-themed superheroes
Captain America